Robin Shepard Engel is an American criminologist and professor in the College of Education Criminal Justice and Human Services at the University of Cincinnati (UC).

She is also UC's Vice President for Safety & Reform and the director of the IACP/UC Center for Police Research and Policy, a collaboration between UC and the International Association of Chiefs of Police (IACP). She is also the former director of UC's Institute of Crime Science. She became UC's first Vice President for Safety & Reform in 2015, when the university created the position in response to the shooting of Samuel DuBose by a UC police officer. UC President Santa Ono said that Engel's "hands-on" approach that she has used to research policing, sometimes involving walking with police officers on their beats, would help her improve the campus's police department.

References

External links
Faculty page

Living people
University of Cincinnati faculty
American criminologists
American women social scientists
University at Albany, SUNY alumni
American women criminologists
Year of birth missing (living people)
American women academics
21st-century American women